Natashquan (Lac de l'Avion) Water Aerodrome  is a private aerodrome located  southeast of Natashquan, Quebec, Canada.

References

Registered aerodromes in Côte-Nord
Seaplane bases in Quebec